Letters to Angel is a 2010 Estonian comedy film directed by Sulev Keedus. The film was selected as the Estonian entry for the Best Foreign Language Film at the 84th Academy Awards, but it did not make the final shortlist. It was also nominated to the Estonian Journalists Prize.

Cast
 Roman Baskin
 Ketter Habakukk as Fee
 Alina Karmazina
 Elle Kull
 Katariina Lauk as Hildegard
 Mari-Liis Lill
 Helena Merzin
 Kaie Mihkelson
 Tõnu Oja as Jeremia Juunas Kirotaja
 Ragne Pekarev as Senta
 Mirtel Pohla as Merily
 Rain Simmul as Elvis
 Tiina Tauraite as Edda

See also
 List of submissions to the 84th Academy Awards for Best Foreign Language Film
 List of Estonian submissions for the Academy Award for Best Foreign Language Film

References

External links
 

2010 films
2010 comedy films
Estonian-language films
Estonian comedy films